The Pasporta Servo is a hospitality exchange service available both online and in print that lists people in Esperanto culture who are willing to offer free homestays to speakers of Esperanto. It is maintained by the World Esperanto Youth Organization (TEJO). The platform is a gift economy; hosts are not allowed to charge for lodging. Guests using the service are encouraged to speak only Esperanto with their hosts.

History
In 1966, psychologist Rubén Feldman González started the Programo Pasporto, a lodging service for Esperanto speakers, in Argentina.

In 1974, the Pasporta Servo directory was first published, listing 40 hosts.

In August 2008, the directory was first published online.

References

External links

 

Hospitality exchange services
Esperanto-language websites
Argentine social networking websites